Tabata Claudia Amaral de Pontes (born 14 November 1993) is a Brazilian politician and education activist. She is currently a federal deputy for the Brazilian Socialist Party (PSB) representing the state of São Paulo. Throughout 2019, she was a vice-leader of the PDT and its associated political coalition.

As an activist for education in Brazil, Amaral co-founded two organisations: Vontade de Aprender Olímpica, which prepares Brazilian students to compete in international olympiads, and Movimento Mapa Educação, which promotes education equality in Brazil. She also co-founded the political organisation Acredito, which provides funding for progressive candidates running for the first time in Brazil.

Before attending university, Amaral represented Brazil in five international science competitions. She then graduated from Harvard University, with a degree in astrophysics and political science. She was also a columnist for Rádio CBN and Glamour magazine.

Early life 
Tabata Amaral de Pontes is the daughter of Maria Renilda Amaral Pires, a domestic worker, and Olionaldo Francisco de Pontes, a bus conductor. She has a younger brother, Allan. They were raised in Vila Missionária (Pt), a poor neighborhood located in the South Zone of São Paulo, on the outskirts of the city.

Tabata Amaral received her primary education in local public schools. In the sixth grade, at the age of 12, Amaral participated in the 2005 edition of the Brazilian Public School Mathematics Olympiad (OBMEP), and won a silver medal on her first attempt. The following year, due to her gold medal and strong academic performance, she obtained a full scholarship at Colégio ETAPA, a private school in São Paulo, where she completed her secondary education. In the following years, she represented Brazil in international chemistry, astronomy and astrophysics Olympiads.

In 2012, Amaral was offered a full scholarship to a number prestigious universities, six of them in the United States: Harvard University, Yale University, Columbia University, Princeton University, University of Pennsylvania and California Institute of Technology; and at the University of São Paulo.

Academic life 
Amaral attended Harvard University, graduating magna cum laude with highest honors in Government and Astrophysics.

In her undergraduate senior thesis, Amaral conducted an analysis of educational reforms in Brazilian municipalities, arguing that despite the expansion of access to education in Brazil over the past two decades, the quality of federal education remains lacking according to international standards. Her thesis received the Kenneth Maxwell Senior Thesis Prize in Brazilian studies, and the Eric Firth Prize for the best essay on the theme of democratic ideals.

Activism
After graduating, Amaral returned to Brazil to work as an education activist.

In 2014, Amaral co-founded the education advocacy organisation Movimento Mapa Educação (the Education Map Movement) with Lígia Stocche and Renan Ferreirinha (Pt). The organisation crowd-sourced concerns about education among young people in Brazil, and then questioned candidates on those education-related issues during the 2016 Brazilian municipal elections, disseminating their responses widely on social media.

In 2017, Amaral co-founded the organisation Acredito (meaning "I believe") with Felipe Oriá and José Frederico Lyra Netto. The organisation promotes young progressive politicians who are seeking office for the first time, with a particular focus on increasing the diversity of federal deputies.

Political career

2018 election
During the 2018 general election, Amaral's campaign for a seat in Brazil's Congress focused primarily on education. She received the sixth highest vote total of any candidate in the state of São Paulo, with 264,450 votes. At the time of her election, she was a member of the Democratic Labor Party (PDT).

Deputy
Building on her background as an education activist, Amaral became a prominent education critic, and was credited with being partly responsible for the removal of Ricardo Vélez Rodríguez as the Minister of Education in the government of Jair Bolsonaro.

She served on the Education Commission, the Commission for the Defense of Women's Rights, and as an alternate member of the Science and Technology, Communication and Informatics Commission. From February 20, 2019 until April 25, 2019, she was the vice-leader of the PDT Block, the electoral coalition of the PDT. From June until November of that year, she was the vice-leader of the PDT.

Amaral voted for reforming the Brazilian security system, which would raise the retirement age; this was a major policy of Jair Bolsonaro's government, and the PDT opposed the reform. Amaral broke party lines together with 8 other deputies of the PDT to vote in favour of the reform, stating that the reforms would be beneficial for education in Brazil. For this she was temporarily suspended from the party. As a result, in September 2021, Amaral announced that she had left the PDT to join the PSB (Partido Socialista Brasileiro ~ Brazilian Socialist Party).

Controversies 
In July 2019, the magazines Veja and Exame revealed that Amaral hired her then-boyfriend, Daniel Alejandro Martínez, to work on her 2018 election campaign. According to the Superior Electoral Court, Amaral spent 23,000 reais (at the time about 6,000 USD) from the public election fund to pay for these services, which were provided between August and October 2018. Amaral's team did not present the results of the services provided by Martínez. In another case, the Supreme Federal Court had previously ruled that hiring relatives or spouses with electoral funds is legal, but the practice has been widely condemned by journalists and commentators. Veja magazine asserted that it was hypocritical for Amaral to engage in this practice, since in a previous interview with the magazine she had taken the anti-corruption position that "renewal in politics is not about changing the name of things or the face in power, but a change of practices".

Personal life
Beginning in 2019, Amaral has been in a relationship with fellow Socialist Party member, former federal deputy from the state of Pernambuco, and current mayor of Recife João Henrique Campos.

Selected honours
BBC 100 inspiring and influential women (2019)
Time 100 Next (2019)

References

Democratic Labour Party (Brazil) politicians
Brazilian Socialist Party politicians
Women political scientists
Brazilian political scientists
Brazilian activists
1993 births
Living people
Pages with unreviewed translations
Harvard College alumni
Members of the Chamber of Deputies (Brazil) from São Paulo
21st-century Brazilian women politicians
BBC 100 Women